Count Giselbert (or Gilbert) (d. before 1138), was the deputy advocate (subadvocatus) of Saint Trudo’s Abbey. At least by 1111 he began to be referred to as not just a count, but specifically the Count of Duras, and he may have been the first to be known under that title. He was son of Otto I, Count of Duras, and his wife Oda. Giselbert was involved in several conflicts which involved the abbey, as mentioned in several parts in the Abbey's Gesta or chronicle.

Apart from the Gesta, much of what we know about Giselbert is from the charters that he witnessed, which also gives insight as to his relationship with the Counts of Namur, a family into which he eventually married. Emperor Henry IV confirmed donations made by Henry I, Count of Durbuy, son of Albert II, Count of Namur, to the Church of Saint James in Liège, as witnessed by Giselbert. The emperor also confirmed the claim of Albert’s family to Saint Begga's Collegiate Church in Andenne.

Giselbert married twice.  His first wife was Gertrud, of unknown parentage.  His second wife was Oda, daughter of Otto II, Count of Chiny, and his wife Alix, daughter of Albert III, Count of Namur.  Giselbert and Gertrud had eight children:
 Otto II, Count of Duras
 Conan of Duras (Appears in Wolters 19th century writer, who cites Mantelius and Butkens, 17th century writers)
 Giselbert of Duras
 Gerard (d. 1174), Abbot of Saint Trudo’s
 Thierry (d. 1183 or after), Archdeacon of Liège 
 Bruno (d. 1177 or after), Canon at Liège, Saint Lambert
 Unnamed daughter, mother of Alexander II, Bishop of Liège (1164-1167)
 Unnamed daughter, mother of Arnulf van Kortessem.

Wolters identifies Julienne, daughter of Otto II, as an additional daughter of Giselbert and Gertrud, but this is unlikely as her husband and their sons inherited the countship of Duras. Upon his death, Giselbert was succeeded as Count of Duras by his son Otto.

Sources 

Baerten, Jean, ‘Les origines des comtes de Looz et la formation territoriale du comté’, in: Revue belge de philologie et d'histoire 43 (2 parts; 1965) 459-491, 1217-1242. On persee: part 1, part 2.
Baerten, Jean, Het Graafschap Loon (11de - 14de eeuw), (Assen 1969).  pdf
Gorissen, P., ‘Omtrent de wording van het graafschap Loon’, in: Jaarboek van de Vereniging van Oudheidkundige en geschiedkundige kringen van België: 32e zitting Congres van Antwerpen 27-31 juli 1947 (1950-1951).
Mantelius, Joannes, Historiae Lossensis libri decem, (Liège 1717). google
Ulens, R., "Les origines et les limites primitives du comté de Duras" Bulletin de la Société Scientifique & littéraire du Limbourg 50 (1936) pp.49-71.
Vaes, Jan, De Graven van Loon. Loons, Luiks, Limburgs (Leuven 2016)
Wolters, Mathias J., Notice Historique sur l’Ancien Comté de Duras en Hesbaie, Gyselinck, 1855 (available on Google Books)
Zeller, Thibaut, "La maison de Durras en Hesbaye : les pilliers de pouvoir d’une parentèle comtale (XIe -XIIe  siècles)", l'Annuaire d'histoire liégeoise, 37, (2007-2008), pp.33-57.

Primary sources
Gestorum Abbatem Trudonensium Continuatio Tertia: Koepker (ed.) MGH SS Vol.10 382; =de Borman (ed.) Vol.2 ; =Lavigne (trans.) 228-229 (pdf).

External links
Medieval Lands Project, Comtes de Duras

Counts
Belgian nobility